Hoppers Crossing railway station is located on the Werribee line in Victoria, Australia. It opened on 16 November 1970 to serve the western Melbourne suburb of Hoppers Crossing.

The Western standard gauge line, which operates between Melbourne and Adelaide, passes to the north of Platform 1.

History
The station's name matches that of the locality on which the suburb was built. Elizabeth Hopper was a gatekeeper, closing and re-opening a set of large timber level crossing gates whenever a train passed through. She and her husband, Stephen Hopper (1832-1908), a railway ganger, lived nearby with their eleven children.

The original station was located on the down (Werribee) side of the former Old Geelong Road level crossing. Problems with stationary trains blocking the level crossing led to the station being relocated to the up (Flinders Street) side of the crossing in July 1983, in conjunction with the electrification of the line to Werribee. Also in that year, boom barriers were provided at the former level crossing.

On 4 May 2010, as part of the 2010/2011 State Budget, $83.7 million was allocated to upgrade Hoppers Crossing to a Premium Station, along with nineteen others. However, in March 2011, this was scrapped by the Baillieu Government.

The crossing was removed as part of the Level Crossing Removal Project, and was replaced with a road overpass 800m to the east of the crossing, directly connecting Old Geelong Road with the Princes Highway. Construction began in February 2021 and, on 9 December 2021, the new road bridge was opened to traffic. The level crossing was closed to road traffic on the same day, and was replaced with a pedestrian overpass, which opened in February 2022.

Platforms and services
Hoppers Crossing has one island platform with two faces. It is served by Werribee line trains.

Platform 1:
  all stations and limited express services to Flinders Street and Frankston

Platform 2:
  all stations services to Werribee

Transport links
CDC Melbourne operates seven bus routes via Hoppers Crossing station, under contract to Public Transport Victoria:
 : Williams Landing station – Werribee station
 : to Tarneit station
 : to Werribee station
 : to Wyndham Vale station
 : to Tarneit station
 : to Werribee station
 : to Laverton station

References

External links
 Melway map at street-directory.com.au

Railway stations in Melbourne
Railway stations in Australia opened in 1970
Railway stations in the City of Wyndham